Mohammed Samara (Arabic: محمد سمارة) (born January 1, 1983) is a Palestinian footballer currently playing for Arab Contractors of the Egyptian Premier League and the Palestine national football team. He received his first official cap in October 2007 he has since been called up for unofficial friendlies, most notably against Dynamo Moscow where he scored a penalty kick in a 1-1 draw. He received his second official cap in a 2014 World Cup Qualifier against Thailand on July 23, 2011.

References

1983 births
Living people
Palestinians
Palestinian footballers
Footballers from Cairo
Al Mokawloon Al Arab SC players
Palestine international footballers
Association football midfielders
Al Ittihad Alexandria Club players
Petrojet SC players
Asyut Petroleum SC players
El Dakhleya SC players
Egyptian Premier League players